Columbus Park Crossing is an outdoor center featuring shopping and dining on the north side of Columbus, Georgia, United States.  Columbus Park Crossing features a variety of hotels, national retailers, restaurants and a movie theatre, as well as specialty local stores and eateries.

References

External links
Columbus Park Crossing

Buildings and structures in Columbus, Georgia
Shopping malls in Georgia (U.S. state)
Shopping malls established in 2002
Tourist attractions in Columbus, Georgia
2002 establishments in Georgia (U.S. state)